Crèvecœur-sur-l'Escaut (literally Crèvecœur on the Scheldt) is a commune in the Nord department in northern France.

Heraldry

See also
Communes of the Nord department

References

Crevecoeursurlescaut